Longmoor may refer to several places:

Long Moor, Berkshire, a heathland surrounded by California Country Park
Longmoor, Hampshire, a place in England, the location of:
Longmoor Military Camp, a British army camp
Longmoor Military Railway, connected the army camp to the mainline rail network
Longmoor, Ontario, a place in Canada